China National Highway 345 runs from Qidong in Jiangsu to Nagqu in Tibet. Its exact length is not known yet, as parts of the route are still under planning, but once completed it will be around 3000 km long. It is one of the new trunk highways proposed in the China National Highway Network Planning (2013 - 2030).

Route
Jiangsu
Construction on the section starting from Qidong commenced in May 2019. It is complete in Jingjiang and Taixing and under construction as a western ring road around Yangzhou.

Anhui
In Fuyang, provincial highway S102 and the Fuyang south ring road were reclassified as G345. G345 is mostly complete in Anhui.

Henan

Shaanxi

Gansu
A part of the Gansu section is relabeled and upgraded former Gansu provincial highways S305 and S307. 

Qinghai
Parts of Qinghai Provincial Highway S309 were upgraded to G345. It connects to G214 at Gyêgu, leading west to Qapugtang.

Tibet
In Nagqu, G345 connects to G109.

References

See also 

 China National Highways

Transport in Jiangsu
Transport in Anhui
Transport in Henan
Transport in Shaanxi
Transport in Gansu
Transport in Qinghai
Transport in Sichuan
Roads in Tibet
345